Meenamarg is one the entry points in Ladakh from Jammu and Kashmir in India. It is just east of Zoji La Pass. Meenamarg lies on the National Highway 1 between Srinagar and Leh. A full-fledged COVID-19 screening post was established in Meenamarg in 2020.

References

Ladakh 
Cities and towns in Ladakh
 
Geography of Ladakh